Narendra Nagar is an Indian politician formerly with the Bhartiya Janata Party. Nagar was elected to Rajasthan Legislative Assembly in 2008 from Khanpur in Jhalawar district on the BJP ticket.

Early life and education 
Nagar graduated from Maharishi Dyanand Saraswati University, Ajmer in 1990.

Notes and references

External sites 
 

People from Jaipur district
Rajasthani politicians
Rajasthan MLAs 2008–2013
Indian National Congress politicians
Living people
Crime in Rajasthan
1960 births
Indian National Congress politicians from Rajasthan